Stoffel Steyn (born 14 August 1941) is a South African boxer. He competed in the men's lightweight event at the 1960 Summer Olympics.

References

1941 births
Living people
South African male boxers
Olympic boxers of South Africa
Boxers at the 1960 Summer Olympics
People from Potchefstroom
Lightweight boxers